Susan Harrison was an American actress.

Susan Harrison may also refer to:

Susan Harrison (British actress)
Susie Frances Harrison, Canadian poet
Susan Harrison (writer and artist)
Susan Harrison (ecologist)

See also
Sue Harrison (disambiguation)